Israel Oludotun Ransome-Kuti (30 April 1891 – 6 April 1955) was a Nigerian clergyman and educationist.

Life
Israel was born on 30 April 1891 in Abeokuta, Ogun State to Josiah Ransome-Kuti and Bertha Anny Olubi. He completed his primary and secondary school education at Lagos Grammar School and Abeokuta Grammar School respectively before proceeding to Fourah Bay College, Freetown where he completed his undergraduate studies.

Upon his graduation from Fourah Bay College, Israel returned to Nigeria in 1916 to begin his career first as a class teacher at Abeokuta Grammar School until 1918 when he left his hometown. He was appointed as the principal of Ijebu Ode Grammar School for thirteen years and went on to found the Association of Headmasters of Ijebu Schools in 1926.

In 1931, Israel was appointed as the pioneering President of the then newly formed Nigeria Union of Teachers,  a position he held until his retirement in 1954. Kuti Hall, one of the halls of residence at the University of Ibadan which opened in 1954, is named after Israel Oludotun Ransome-Kuti.

Death
On 6 April 1955, Israel died of a cancer-related illness at his residence in Abeokuta, Ogun State.

Bibliography

References

1891 births
1955 deaths
Ijebu Ode Grammar School faculty
Ransome-Kuti family
Fourah Bay College alumni
People from Abeokuta
Nigerian educational theorists
20th-century Nigerian people
CMS Grammar School, Lagos alumni
Yoruba educators
Deaths from cancer in Nigeria
Nigerian Christian clergy
Yoruba Christian clergy
19th-century Nigerian people
People from colonial Nigeria
20th-century Nigerian educators
Heads of schools in Nigeria